Hafun District is a district in the northeastern Bari or Puntland Region of Somalia. It faces the Guardafui Channel and its capital is Hafun.

See also
 Horn of Africa
 Ras Hafun

References

Districts of Somalia
Bari, Somalia